Haris Hajdarević (born 7 October 1998) is a Bosnian professional footballer who plays as a central midfielder for Bosnian Premier League club Željezničar.

Club career
Born in Sarajevo, Hajdarević started playing football at his hometown club Željezničar, who loaned him to Sloboda Tuzla in 2020. In January 2021, he left Željezničar and joined Turkish club Boluspor for an undisclosed transfer fee.

In August 2021, Hajdarević returned to Željezničar. He made his second debut for the club in a Sarajevo derby game against FK Sarajevo on 22 September 2021.

International career
Hajdarević was a member of the Bosnia and Herzegovina national under-21 team.

Honours
Željezničar 
Bosnian Cup: 2017–18

References

External links
Haris Hajdarević at Sofascore

1998 births
Living people
Footballers from Sarajevo
Association football midfielders
Bosnia and Herzegovina footballers
Bosnia and Herzegovina under-21 international footballers
FK Željezničar Sarajevo players
FK Sloboda Tuzla players 
Boluspor footballers 
Premier League of Bosnia and Herzegovina players
TFF First League players 
Bosnia and Herzegovina expatriate footballers
Expatriate footballers in Turkey
Bosnia and Herzegovina expatriate sportspeople in Turkey